Tobermory High School is the only secondary school on the Isle of Mull. It is located in Tobermory, at the northern end of the island.

Its feeder primary schools are at Tobermory, Salen, Dervaig, Lochdon (near Craignure), and Ulva Ferry. Although it is an Argyll and Bute council school, it also takes pupils from Kilchoan on the mainland, which is linked to Tobermory by ferry.

The former head of the school is Jennifer McGhee who retired in October 2020. Richard Gawthrope is now the head teacher of Tobermory High School, starting the job in October 2020 following 12 years as deputy head teacher at the school.

References

External links
Official Tobermory High School Site

 

Secondary schools in Argyll and Bute
Primary schools in Argyll and Bute
Buildings and structures on the Isle of Mull
Scottish Gaelic-language secondary schools
Tobermory, Mull